Gueiren District is a rural district in southern Tainan, Taiwan. It is home to the Tainan HSR station.

History 
After the handover of Taiwan from Japan to the Republic of China in 1945, Rende was organized as a rural township of Tainan County. On 25 December 2010, Tainan County was merged with Tainan City and Rende was upgraded to a district of the city.

Administrative divisions 
The district consists of Nanbao, Liujia, Guiren, Houshi, Gucuo, Xucuo, Kanxi, Kantung, Lunding, Shalun, Datan, Wutung, Bajia, Qijia, Mamiao, Xipu, Damiao, Nanxing, Xincuo, Guinan and Wenhua Village.

Economy 
The local economy is based mainly on agriculture, including sugar-apples, peanuts, starfruit and guavas. It also houses the Shalun Smart Green Energy Science City.

Education 
 National Yang Ming Chiao Tung University
 Chang Jung Christian University
 National Hsin-Feng Senior High School

Tourist attractions 
 Gueiren Excellencies Temple
 Guiren Living Art Center
 Lobster Pool
 Renshou Temple
 Temple of Confucius
 World Snake Educational Farm

Transportation 
 Tainan HSR station - can transfer to Shalun railway station
 Chang Jung Christian University railway station

Notable natives 
 Lee Ming-liang, Minister of Department of Health (2000–2002)

References

External links 

 
 Name origin

Districts of Tainan